Tina Dupuy is the former communications director for Congressman Alan Grayson, and has been a nationally syndicated op-ed columnist, freelance investigative journalist and comedian.

She freelances for Los Angeles Times, The Atlantic, Fast Company, LA Weekly, Newsday, Mother Jones, and Skeptic. Her weekly op-ed column is nationally syndicated through Daryl Cagle's website Cagle Cartoons. Dupuy's writing has also been published in books including a collection of short stories called What Was I Thinking? (St. Martin's Press, 2009) and the English textbook Exploring Language 13th Edition (Longman, 2011).

After The Tampa Tribune used an article of Dupuy's without paying for it in 2009, she created a YouTube video to shame the paper into paying $75 for the piece.

As a teenager, Dupuy was convinced that she was an alcoholic and joined Alcoholics Anonymous, and would eventually gain prominence for telling the story of her sobriety to AA audiences. Twenty years later, however, having drifted away from the organization, she began to question the interpretation she had been given of her life story, and decided the only way to know for sure whether she was an alcoholic was to have a drink and see what happened. She discussed the process that led to this conclusion in an interview for This American Life.

Dupuy has spoken openly about being born into the cult The Children of God and subsequently being raised in foster care in California. She created the podcast Cultish, in which she interviewed former members of cults and discussed her uncle Rick Dupuy's public defection.

In late 2017, Dupuy wrote she asked to join comedian and senator Al Franken for a photo and he squeezed her waist, twice.

Dupuy and her husband live in New York City.

References

External links
 

American columnists
American women columnists
American investigative journalists
American political journalists
American stand-up comedians
Living people
Year of birth missing (living people)
American media critics
Former members of The Family International
21st-century American women